Homonoides is a genus of moths belonging to the subfamily Tortricinae of the family Tortricidae. It contains only one species, Homonoides euryplaca, which is found in Madagascar.

See also
List of Tortricidae genera

References

External links
tortricidae.com

Archipini
Monotypic moth genera
Moths of Madagascar
Tortricidae genera